Henry Mildmay (25 November 1619 – 3 December 1692) was an English politician who sat in the House of Commons  at various times between 1654 and 1692. He fought in the Parliamentary army in the English Civil War.

Biography
Mildmay was the eldest son  of Sir Henry Mildmay of Graces, Little Baddow and his second wife Amy Gurdon, daughter of Brampton Gurdon of Assington, Suffolk. He was educated at Felsted School under Martin Holbeach and entered Gray's Inn in 1632. His father died in 1639 and he succeeded to the estate at Little Baddow. He was captain of horse in the Parliamentary army in 1642 and was a  colonel in 1643. Also in 1643 he was commissioner for levying money for Essex, commissioner for defence for the eastern association and  commissioner for execution of ordinances. He was commissioner for militia for Middlesex  in 1644 and commissioner for assessment for Essex from 1644 to 1652. In 1645  he was commissioner for new model ordinance for Essex 1645, commissioner for defence for Ely 1645, governor of Cambridge Castle and became J.P. for until July 1660.In 1648 he was commissioner for militia for  Essex. He was commissioner for assessment for  Shropshire from 1650 to 1652 and JP for Shropshire from 1650 to 1653.

In 1654, Mildmay was elected Member of Parliament for Essex in the First Protectorate Parliament. He was also commissioner for scandalous ministers for Essex in 1654. In 1656 he was re-elected MP for Essex in the Second Protectorate Parliament . He was commissioner for assessment for Essex in 1657.  In 1659 he was elected MP for  Maldon in the Third Protectorate Parliament. He was also commissioner for militia for  Essex in 1659. In January 1660 he was  commissioner for assessment for Essex and in March 1660 he was  commissioner for militia for  Essex and Middlesex. In April 1660 he was re-elected MP for Maldon in the Convention Parliament when he was involved in a double return but was allowed to take his seat. He was commissioner for assessment for  Middlesex from August 1660 to 1663. He did not stand for the Cavalier Parliament at a time when his kinsman Henry Mildmay was in disgrace. He became JP for Essex in 1664 but in 1672 he was found to have plotted false accusations against his enemy John Bramston and was turned out of all commissions. In 1679 he was returned as MP for Essex in both elections, and was re-elected in 1681, 1689 and 1690. He was restored as JP for  Essex in April 1688 and was commissioner for assessment for Essex from 1689 to 1690.

Mildmay died at the age of  83 and was buried at Little Baddow.

Family
Mildmay married firstly Cicely Barker, daughter of Walter Barker of Haughmond, Shropshire, and had two daughters. He married secondly Mary Mildmay daughter of Robert Mildmay of Overton, Northamptonshire on 30 June 1657 and had four sons and five daughters. The eldest daughter Mary (1660–1724) married Charles Goodwin, owner of Rowfant in Sussex.

Notes

References

1619 births
1692 deaths
Burials in Essex
Roundheads
Members of Gray's Inn
People educated at Felsted School
People from the City of Chelmsford
English MPs 1654–1655
English MPs 1656–1658
English MPs 1659
English MPs 1660
English MPs 1679
English MPs 1680–1681
English MPs 1681
English MPs 1689–1690
English MPs 1690–1695